The Center School, now known as the Lincoln School Apartments, is located at 1730 South 11th Street in South Omaha, Nebraska, United States. Built in 1893, it was declared an Omaha Landmark June 18, 1985 and listed on the National Register of Historic Places on August 23, 1985.

The building is one of only a very few major examples of the Richardsonian Romanesque style remaining in Omaha. Center School is one of 35 Omaha schools designed by architect John Latenser, Sr. The building was rehabilitated into apartments in 1987.

References

External links
 

Elementary schools in Omaha, Nebraska
Apartment buildings in Omaha, Nebraska
National Register of Historic Places in Omaha, Nebraska
John Latenser Sr. buildings
Richardsonian Romanesque architecture in Nebraska
Defunct schools in Nebraska
School buildings on the National Register of Historic Places in Nebraska